Rivaz railway station is a railway station in the municipality of Rivaz, in the Swiss canton of Vaud. It is an intermediate stop on the standard gauge Simplon line of Swiss Federal Railways.

Services 
 the following services stop at Rivaz:

References

External links 
 
 

Railway stations in the canton of Vaud
Swiss Federal Railways stations